The Speaker of the Connecticut House of Representatives is the presiding officer of the Connecticut House of Representatives.

References 
 

Connecticut